Visual arts in Sri Lanka refers to a variety of visual art forms, including as painting, drawing, sculpture architecture and other visual arts from the ancient time to modern Sri Lanka. The history of visual art of Sri Lanka has long history, starting from the 2nd or 3rd century BC to the present day.

See also 
 Kandyan Era Frescoes

References

External links 

Sri Lankan art
Sri Lanka